Harald Jähner (born March 26, 1953) is a German journalist and author. Since 2011 he has been an honorary professor of cultural journalism at the Berlin University of the Arts.

Biography 
Jähner studied literature, history and art history in Freiburg and completed his doctorate in Berlin. After graduation, he worked as a freelance journalist. From 1989 to 1997 Jähner was head of the communication department of the House of World Cultures in Berlin.
At the same time from 1994 to 1997 he wrote as a freelance literary critic for the Frankfurter Allgemeine Zeitung. He then worked as an editor at the Berliner Zeitung, where he headed the Feuilleton department from 2003 to 2015. Since 2011, Jähner has been honorary professor of cultural journalism at Berlin University of the Arts. In 2019, Jähner published Wolfszeit, Germany and the Germans 1945 – 1955, a consideration of German life in the post-war decade 1945–1955 published by Rowohlt Berlin.

Awards

In 2019, Jähner won the Leipzig Book Fair Prize for Wolfszeit (Category: Non-fiction book / Essay writing)

Bibliography
 Wolfszeit, Rowohlt Berlin, Berlin 2019, . English title Aftermath.
 Aftermath: Life in the Fallout of the Third Reich, 1945–1955 - Translated from German by Shaun Whiteside.
 Erzählter, montierter, soufflierter Text. Zur Konstruktion des Romans "Berlin Alexanderplatz" von Alfred Döblin, Verlag Peter Lang, Frankfurt am Main 1984, .
 Herausgegeben gemeinsam mit Krista Tebbe: Alfred Döblin zum Beispiel. Stadt und Literatur., Elefanten Press, Berlin 1987, .

References

External links
 
 Autorenprofil beim Rowohlt Verlag

Literary scholars
1953 births
Academic staff of the Berlin University of the Arts
German journalists
Living people
German art historians
21st-century German writers
German non-fiction writers
German-language writers